Baillargeon is a surname. Notable people with the surname include:

 Annie Baillargeon (born 1978), Canadian artist
 Charles-François Baillargeon (1798–1870), Canadian Roman Catholic priest and archbishop
 David Baillargeon (born 1996), Canadian squash player
 Hélène Baillargeon, (1916–1997), Canadian singer, actor and folklorist
 Joel Baillargeon (born 1964), Canadian ice hockey left winger
 Luce Baillargeon (born 1977), Canadian judoka
 Pascal Baillargeon (born 1986), Canadian football offensive lineman
 Paul Baillargeon (born 1943), Canadian composer, known for his music for television shows
 Paule Baillargeon (born 1945), Canadian actress and film director
 Pierre Baillargeon (politician) (1812–1891), Canadian physician and political figure
 Pierre Baillargeon (1916–1967), Quebec writer and literary critic
 Renée Baillargeon (born 1954), Canadian academic